Tomasz Pusz (also known as, Szamot; born 21 March 1997) is a Polish musician, multi-instrumentalist, songwriter, vocalist and record producer.

Life 
Pusz was born in Prudnik, Poland. He went to a gymnasium in Prudnik, Medical School in Prudnik and University of Applied Sciences in Nysa.

In 2016 he formed a black metal band Sovran. He also worked with the group Exit the Machine from Głuchołazy. In 2018 he started a solo career under the pseudonym Szamot. In 2019 he transferred money from the sales of his albums to Great Orchestra of Christmas Charity. On 21 May 2019 he played with Jan Borysewicz in Rybnik. He was announced the Polish artist of the day by the website heavyrock.pl on 23 October 2019.

Associated acts 
 Extreme Madness (2013–2015)
 Sovran (2016–present)
 Exit the Machine (2019–present)

Discography

Solo career

Studio albums 
 Astral Domina (2018)
 Sleeping Existence (2019)
 Seasons: Spring & Summer (2019)
 The Sign of the Inverted Cross (2019)
 Seasons: Autumn & Winter (2019)

Live albums 
 Live at the Bar (2019)
 Dreamland & Wasteland (2019)

Singles 
 The Devil’s Song (2019)
 Desolate Forest (2019)

EPs 
 The House of Dead Mother (2018)
 Let the Lies Burn (2019)

Sovran 
 Nieświęci (demo; 2018)
 III (single; 2020)
 Exitus Letalis (2020)

References

External links 
 

1997 births
Living people
Polish heavy metal guitarists
Polish heavy metal drummers
Polish heavy metal bass guitarists
Acoustic guitarists
21st-century multi-instrumentalists
Polish record producers
Polish lyricists
Polish heavy metal singers
People from Prudnik